Caroline Ann Powell (born 21 December 1953) is a track and field sprint athlete who competes as a Masters athlete for Great Britain.  She is the current World record holder in the W60 400 metres.  She also hold the world record as a member of relay teams in the W50 4x100 metres, the W50 and W60 4x400 metres.  She also holds the world indoor records in the W50, W55 and W60 divisions of the 400 metres and as a member of the W60 4x200 metres relay team. She runs for the Bristol and West Athletic Club.

Personal bests

References
 

1953 births
Living people
British female sprinters
World record holders in masters athletics